Kamilla and the Thief (Kamilla og Tyven) is a Norwegian family movie from 1988 directed by Grete Salomonsen and produced by her husband Odd Hynnekleiv. The movie  is an adaption from a Norwegian children's novel by Kari Vinje, and is the first  feature film of renowned Norwegian actor Dennis Storhøi and also stars 1980s pop idol Morten Harket in a minor role. Kamilla and the Thief was a huge success in Norway, selling half a million tickets (in a country of about 4 million people). It was so popular that a sequel was made, Kamilla and the Thief II, which was released the year after. In 2005 both movies were digitally restored and released on DVD.

Cast
 Veronika Flåt as Kamilla
 Dennis Storhøi as Sebastian
 Agnete Haaland as Sofie
 Morten Harket as Christoffer

Production
Kamilla and the Thief was the first feature film to be produced in Kristiansand, and was financed privately, in a time when it was common (and still is) for Norwegian films to receive support from the government to get produced. Producer Odd Hynnekleiv used three years to find investors to the project.  After the film's success it took only three weeks to secure investors for the sequel, Kamilla and the Thief II.

Hynnkleiv and his wife, director Grete Salomonsen produced the film with their own company, Penelope Film. The crew were mixed with local talent and international craftsmen.

External links 

1988 films
Films directed by Grete Salomonsen
Norwegian children's films
1980s Norwegian-language films